They Staked Their Lives is a 1940 Swedish drama film directed by Alf Sjöberg.

Cast
 Aino Taube as Wanda
 Åke Ohberg as John
 Anders Henrikson as Max (as Anders Henriksson)
 Gösta Cederlund as Baker
 Holger Löwenadler as Miller
 Eivor Landström as Eva
 Hampe Faustman as Freedom fighter (as Erik Faustman)
 Bengt Ekerot as Freedom fighter
 Torsten Hillberg as Colonel
 Ernst Brunman as Innkeeper
 Frithiof Bjärne as Captain (as Fritjof Bjärne)

References

External links
 

1940 films
1940s Swedish-language films
1940 drama films
Swedish black-and-white films
Swedish drama films
Films directed by Alf Sjöberg
1940s Swedish films